José Mateo Mejía Piedrahita (born 21 March 2003) is a Colombian and Spanishfootballer who plays as a striker for Manchester United.

Career

Club career

As a youth player, Mejía joined the youth academy of Spanish second-tier side Zaragoza. In 2019, he joined the youth academy of Manchester United in the English Premier League.

International career

Mejía is eligible to represent Colombia internationally through his parents.

References

External links
 

2003 births
Association football forwards
Expatriate footballers in England
Living people
Spanish expatriate footballers
Spanish expatriate sportspeople in England
Spanish footballers
Spanish people of Colombian descent